Chapline Street Row Historic District is a national historic district located at Wheeling, Ohio County, West Virginia. The district encompasses 10 contributing buildings, including eight residences.  All buildings are brick with sandstone foundations.  The first building was built in 1853, with some buildings added through the 1870s, and the last in 1896.  The houses are in the Late Victorian style and are considered an architectural "super block."

It was listed on the National Register of Historic Places in 1984.

References

External links

Houses in Wheeling, West Virginia
Houses on the National Register of Historic Places in West Virginia
Historic districts in Wheeling, West Virginia
Historic American Buildings Survey in West Virginia
National Register of Historic Places in Wheeling, West Virginia
Victorian architecture in West Virginia
Historic districts on the National Register of Historic Places in West Virginia